Vernayaz MC railway station is a railway station in the municipality of Vernayaz, in the Swiss canton of Valais. It is located on the  gauge Martigny–Châtelard line of Transports de Martigny et Régions. The depot for the line is located just south of the entrance to the station. There is no local transport connection.

Services 
 the following services stop at Vernayaz MC:

References

External links 
 
 

Railway stations in the canton of Valais
Transports de Martigny et Régions stations